Elna Møller Moltke (12 December 1913  – 22  May 1994)  was a Danish architect and author.

Biography
Moltke was born at  Tange Skovgård in  Højbjerg parish, Denmark.
She was the daughter of  Niels Rasmussen Møller (1880-1950) and Johanne Due Thomsen (1880-1959).
She attended  from Viborg Katedralskole, taking her  mathematical graduate degree in 1933. From 1936-38, she worked at the office of architect    Johannes Magdahl Nielsen  (1862-1941).
She was admitted to the Royal Danish Academy of Fine Arts, School of Architecture in Copenhagen, from which she graduated in 1941 as an architect.

From 1939, she began to work for the National Museum of Denmark where from 1944 she began to contribute to the monumental work Danmarks Kirker which set out be provide detailed descriptions of all the churches in Denmark. In 1970, she became the principal editor when she replaced her husband Erik Moltke. She received an award  for her restoration work on two properties in Copenhagen in the 1940s.

Personal life
In 1949, she married Erik Moltke (1901–1984). Møller died during 1994 in Frederiksberg.

Awards
Møller received the Worsaae Medal in 1983. She received the N. L. Høyen Medal in 1984.

References

Extermal links
 Source (Festskrift)

1913 births
1994 deaths
People from Aarhus
Royal Danish Academy of Fine Arts alumni
Danish architects
Danish women architects
20th-century Danish non-fiction writers
Danish women writers
20th-century non-fiction writers